Petra Zublasing (born 30 June 1989) is an Italian sport shooter who won the 10 m air rifle event at the 2014 World Championships.

Career
She first competed internationally in 2003, having begun sports shooting in 2001.

She competed in the Women's 10 metre air rifle and the women's 50 metre three positions events at the 2012 Summer Olympics. She won her first World Cup event in 2013 in Granada.  In 2014, she won her greatest title to date, winning the women's 10 m air rifle event at the 2014 World Championships.  To win, she beat the then reigning Olympic champion Yi Siling by 0.3 points with the last shot of the event.  Earlier that year, she had set a new world record in the women's 50 m three positions event at the World Cup event in Fort Benning, having set the previous world record at the 2013 World Cup Final in Munich.

At the 2016 Olympics she competed in the same two events, reaching the final in the 50 m.  She studied at West Virginia University.

References

External links
 

1989 births
Living people
Italian female sport shooters
Olympic shooters of Italy
Shooters at the 2012 Summer Olympics
Shooters at the 2016 Summer Olympics
Sportspeople from Bolzano
West Virginia Mountaineers rifle shooters
Shooters at the 2015 European Games
European Games gold medalists for Italy
European Games medalists in shooting
Universiade medalists in shooting
Mediterranean Games gold medalists for Italy
Mediterranean Games silver medalists for Italy
Mediterranean Games medalists in shooting
Competitors at the 2013 Mediterranean Games
Universiade gold medalists for Italy
Shooters at the 2019 European Games
Medalists at the 2011 Summer Universiade
20th-century Italian women
21st-century Italian women